Proud may refer to:

Music
 Proud (Heather Small album), the debut album by Heather Small
 "Proud" (Heather Small song), a song by Heather Small that was the official song for the London 2012 Olympic bid
 Proud (compilation album), a New Zealand hip hop compilation album 
 "Proud" (Britannia High song), a 2008 song written for Britannia High and later covered by Susan Boyle
 "Proud" (JLS song), a 2012 song by the English boy band JLS
 "Proud" (Key Glock song), a 2022 song by American rapper Key Glock
 "Proud" (Tamara Todevska song), 2019 song that represented North Macedonia in the Eurovision Song Contest 2019
 "Proud", a 1975 song by Roger Daltrey from Ride a Rock Horse
 "Proud", a song by Korn from Live & Rare
 "Proud", a song by Todrick Hall from Straight Outta Oz
 "Proud", a song by Rita Ora

Other uses
 Proud (surname)
 Proud (film), a 2004 film dramatizing the story of the African American crew of the USS Mason (DE-529)
 Proud (play), a 2009 play by John Stanley
 Proud Island, South Georgia, Atlantic Ocean

See also
 List of people known as the Proud
 Pride, the sense of one's own worth